Concerviano is a  (municipality) in the Province of Rieti in the Italian region of Latium, located about  northeast of Rome and about  southeast of Rieti.

Its frazione Pratoianni is the site of the Benedictine Territorial Abbacy of San Salvatore Maggiore.

References 

Cities and towns in Lazio